Valea Stânei River may refer to:

 Valea Stânei, a tributary of the Bistrița in Suceava County
 Valea Stânei, a tributary of the Capra in Neamț County
 Valea Stânei, a tributary of the Izvorul Dorului in Prahova County
 Valea Stânei, a tributary of the Prahova in Brașov County
 Valea Stânei, a tributary of the Valea lui Coman in Argeș County

See also 
 Valea Stânei (disambiguation)
 Stâna River (disambiguation)